Swansea East is a borough constituency represented in the House of Commons of the Parliament of the United Kingdom by Carolyn Harris of the Labour Party.

Boundaries 

The constituency comprises the electoral wards of Bonymaen, Cwmbwrla, Brynhyfryd, Landore, Llansamlet, Morriston, Mynydd-Bach, Penderry and St. Thomas. It has been a Labour seat since 1922.

1918–1949: The County Borough of Swansea wards of East, Landore, Morriston, and St John's.

1950–1955: The County Borough of Swansea wards of Alexandra, Castle, Clase, Kilvey, Landore, Llansamlet, Morriston, Penderry, St John's, and St Thomas.

1955–1983: The County Borough of Swansea wards of Castle, Landore, Llansamlet, Morriston, Penderry, St John's, and St Thomas.

Constituency profile
Although the constituency voted strongly to leave the European Union in 2016, an analysis of YouGov polling by Focaldata suggested support for Remain had risen from 37.9% to 50.7% in August 2018. However, in the 2019 European elections the city of Swansea as a whole voted strongly for the Brexit Party.

Members of Parliament

Elections

Elections in the 1910s

Elections in the 1920s

Elections in the 1930s

Elections in the 1940s

Elections in the 1950s

Elections in the 1960s

Elections in the 1970s

Elections in the 1980s

Elections in the 1990s

Elections in the 2000s

Elections in the 2010s

Of the 107 rejected ballots:
81 were either unmarked or it was uncertain who the vote was for.
25 voted for more than one candidate.
1 had writing or mark by which the voter could be identified.

Of the 66 rejected ballots:
50 were either unmarked or it was uncertain who the vote was for.
12 voted for more than one candidate.
4 had writing or mark by which the voter could be identified.

See also
 Swansea East (Senedd constituency)
 List of parliamentary constituencies in West Glamorgan
 List of parliamentary constituencies in Wales

Notes

References

External links
Politics Resources (Election results from 1922 onwards)
Electoral Calculus (Election results from 1955 onwards)
2017 Election House of Commons Library 2017 Election report
A Vision Of Britain Through Time (Constituency elector numbers)

Parliamentary constituencies in South Wales
Politics of Swansea
Constituencies of the Parliament of the United Kingdom established in 1918